Caterham High School is a mixed, comprehensive 11-18 school in Clayhall, London.

There are 1100 students in the school. The school is supported by the Arts Council. It had a newly built school building in 2006 at a cost of £1.4 million.

The school has many sports facilities available from football, netball and basketball courts to gyms, netball and badminton courts and lastly a huge swimming pool used by all students.

British racing driver Scott Malvern was a pupil at Caterham High School during 2000–2006.

References

Secondary schools in the London Borough of Redbridge
Community schools in the London Borough of Redbridge